The 2019–20 Liga IV Bucharest was the 52nd season of the Liga IV Bucharest, the fourth tier of the Romanian football league system. The season began on 23 August 2019 and was scheduled to end in June 2020, but was suspended in March because of the COVID-19 pandemic in Romania. 

On 15 July 2020, AMF Bucharest (Municipal Football Association) decided to freeze the season and declared the first ranked team after 18 rounds, Steaua București, the municipal champion and the participant at the promotion play-off to Liga III.

Team changes

To Liga IV Bucharest
Relegated from Liga III
 —

Promoted from Liga V Bucharest
 Power Team București
 Rapid FNG București
 Sportivii București

From Liga IV Bucharest
Promoted to Liga III
 —

Relegated to Liga V Bucharest
 LPS Mircea Eliade București
 Vis de București

Other changes
 Tricolor București, Real Crângași and Carmen București withdrew from Liga IV before the start of the season.
 Rapid București II and Electrica București were enrolled on demand, in Liga IV, due to the lack of teams.

Competition format
The 16 teams will play a regular season, followed by a championship play-off. The regular season is a double round-robin tournament and at the end of the regular season, the top four ranked teams qualify for the championship play-off, which is also a double round-robin tournament.

League table

Promotion play-off

Champions of Liga IV – Bucharest face champions of Liga IV – Giurgiu County and Liga IV – Ialomița County.

Region 6 (South)

Group B

See also

Main Leagues
 2019–20 Liga I
 2019–20 Liga II
 2019–20 Liga III
 2019–20 Liga IV

County Leagues (Liga IV series)

 2019–20 Liga IV Alba
 2019–20 Liga IV Arad
 2019–20 Liga IV Argeș
 2019–20 Liga IV Bacău
 2019–20 Liga IV Bihor
 2019–20 Liga IV Bistrița-Năsăud
 2019–20 Liga IV Botoșani
 2019–20 Liga IV Brăila
 2019–20 Liga IV Brașov
 2019–20 Liga IV Buzău
 2019–20 Liga IV Călărași
 2019–20 Liga IV Caraș-Severin
 2019–20 Liga IV Cluj
 2019–20 Liga IV Constanța
 2019–20 Liga IV Covasna
 2019–20 Liga IV Dâmbovița
 2019–20 Liga IV Dolj
 2019–20 Liga IV Galați 
 2019–20 Liga IV Giurgiu
 2019–20 Liga IV Gorj
 2019–20 Liga IV Harghita
 2019–20 Liga IV Hunedoara
 2019–20 Liga IV Ialomița
 2019–20 Liga IV Iași
 2019–20 Liga IV Ilfov
 2019–20 Liga IV Maramureș
 2019–20 Liga IV Mehedinți
 2019–20 Liga IV Mureș
 2019–20 Liga IV Neamț
 2019–20 Liga IV Olt
 2019–20 Liga IV Prahova
 2019–20 Liga IV Sălaj
 2019–20 Liga IV Satu Mare
 2019–20 Liga IV Sibiu
 2019–20 Liga IV Suceava
 2019–20 Liga IV Teleorman
 2019–20 Liga IV Timiș
 2019–20 Liga IV Tulcea
 2019–20 Liga IV Vâlcea
 2019–20 Liga IV Vaslui
 2019–20 Liga IV Vrancea

References

External links
 Official website 

Liga IV seasons
Sport in Bucharest